The Netherlands women's national 3x3 basketball team is the basketball side that represents the Netherlands in international 3x3 basketball (3 against 3) competitions. It is organized and run by Basketball Nederland.

World Cup record

References

External links
Official website

B
Women's national 3x3 basketball teams